The New Communist Party of Yugoslavia (NKPJ) is an anti-revisionist Marxist–Leninist communist party in Serbia. Its goal is the reunification of Yugoslavia as a communist state according to Marxism–Leninism.

The party boycotted the 2007 parliamentary election, because of its position that the electoral law violated fundamental democratic principles and the Universal Declaration of Human Rights. In 2010 the party was removed from the list of registered parties after failing to re-register under the new electoral law.

Due to the removal from the list of registered parties NKPJ decided to boycott the 2014 parliamentary election as well as all local elections and not join any coalitions. They interrupted several meetings of other political parties urging for boycott of the elections and claiming they were illegal.

History 
The founding congress of the New Communist Party of Yugoslavia (NKPJ) was held on 30 June 1990 in Belgrade. The Congress (Founding Assembly) was held in the hall of the Association of Engineers and Technicians of Serbia, with the participation of 265 delegates from all republics of the Socialist Federal Republic of Yugoslavia. The delegates present decided that the party should be named the New Communist Movement of Yugoslavia (NKPJ). That name was valid until 1995, when it was changed to today's New Communist Party of Yugoslavia (NKPJ).

Modern period (2017–present) 
In March 2020, NKPJ announced their participation in the 2020 parliamentary election. They submitted their list on 5 June, and they failed to give signatures after its deadline was extended for two days. In late December 2021, they announced their participation in the upcoming 2022 general election.

Belgrade was the host of the 2022  (MECYO) which the NKPJ's SKOJ is member of. Delegates of 22 youth communist organizations agreed on a declaration that denounced anti-communist repression in the European Union, reissued solidarity with Ukrainian communist activists Mikhail and Aleksander Kononovich who were arrested and detained as political prisoners by the SBU on charges of "pro-Russian views and pro-Belarusian views", denounced "capitalist exploitation and imperialist wars" as well as the "NATO occupation of Kosovo and Metohija"; having taken part in a protester march along central Belgrade chanting anti-NATO slogans the day earlier.

Ideology 
NKPJ is a communist party that endeavors the re-unification of Yugoslavia according to Stalinist model.

Organization 
It had sister parties in neighboring Bosnia and Herzegovina, Montenegro, and North Macedonia. It also tried to organize sister parties in Croatia and Slovenia, but failed at doing so. Its current general secretary is Aleksandar Banjanac, he has served the role since January 2017.

Electoral performance

Parliamentary elections

Federal elections

Parliamentary elections

See also 
 Communist Party (Serbia)
 League of Communists of Yugoslavia in Serbia
 Party of Labour (Serbia)

Notes

References

External links 
Webpage of the New Communist Party of Yugoslavia
Webpage of the League of Yugoslav Communist Youth (SKOJ).

1990 establishments in Yugoslavia
Anti-revisionist organizations
Stalinist parties
Communist parties in Serbia
Far-left politics in Serbia
Marxist parties
Political parties established in 1990
Political parties in Yugoslavia
International Meeting of Communist and Workers Parties